The Archery competition in the 2003 Summer Universiade were held in Daegu, South Korea.

Medal overview

Men's events

Women's events

2003 Summer Universiade
Universiade
2003